Porter Wayne Wagoner (August 12, 1927 – October 28, 2007) was an American country music singer known for his flashy Nudie and Manuel suits and blond pompadour.

In 1967, he introduced singer Dolly Parton on his television show, The Porter Wagoner Show. She became part of a well-known vocal duo with him from the late 1960s to the early 1970s.

Known as Mr. Grand Ole Opry, Wagoner charted 81 singles from 1954 to 1983. He was elected to the Country Music Hall of Fame in 2002.

Biography

Early life and career
Wagoner was born in West Plains, Missouri, United States, the son of Bertha May (née Bridges) and Charles E. Wagoner, a farmer. His first band, the Blue Ridge Boys, performed on radio station KWPM-AM from a butcher shop in his native West Plains, where Wagoner cut meat. In 1951, he was hired by Si Siman as a performer on KWTO in Springfield, Missouri. This led to a contract with RCA Victor.

With lagging sales, Wagoner and his trio played schoolhouses for the gate proceeds; but in 1953 his song "Trademark" became a hit for Carl Smith, followed by a few hits of his own for RCA Victor. Starting in 1955, he was a featured performer on ABC-TV's Ozark Jubilee in Springfield. He often appeared on the show as part of the Porter Wagoner Trio with Don Warden and Speedy Haworth. Warden, on steel guitar, became Wagoner's long-time business manager. In 1957, Wagoner and Warden moved to Nashville, Tennessee, joining the Grand Ole Opry.

Chart success 
Wagoner's 81 charted records include "A Satisfied Mind" (No. 1, 1955), "Misery Loves Company" (No. 1, 1962), "I've Enjoyed as Much of This as I Can Stand" (No. 7, 1962–1963), "Sorrow on the Rocks" (No. 5, 1964), "Green, Green Grass of Home" (No. 4, 1965), "Skid Row Joe" (No. 3, 1965–1966), "The Cold Hard Facts of Life" (No. 2, 1967), and "The Carroll County Accident" (No. 2, 1968–1969).

Among his hit duets with Dolly Parton were a remake of Tom Paxton's "The Last Thing on My Mind" (1967), "We'll Get Ahead Someday" (1968), "Just Someone I Used to Know" (1969), "Daddy Was An Old Time Preacher Man", (1970), "Better Move it on Home" (1971), "The Right Combination" (1972), "Please Don't Stop Loving Me" (No. 1, 1974) and "Making Plans" (No. 2, 1980). He also won three Grammy Awards for gospel recordings.

Television series 
His syndicated television program, The Porter Wagoner Show, aired from 1960 to 1981. There were 686 30-minute episodes taped, the first 104 (1960–66) in black-and-white and the remainder (1966–81) in color. At its peak, his show was featured in over 100 markets, with an average viewership of over three million. Reruns of the program air on the rural cable network RFD-TV and its sister channel in the UK Rural TV.The shows usually featured opening performances by Wagoner with performances by Norma Jean, or later Dolly Parton, and comedic interludes by Speck Rhodes. During Parton's tenure, she and Wagoner usually sang a duet. Each episode also featured a guest who would usually perform one or two songs. A spiritual or gospel performance was almost always featured toward the end of the show, generally performed by either Wagoner or Parton or the show's guest star, or occasionally the entire cast.  After Parton left the show, Porter began taping the show at Opryland USA in various locations around the park.

The shows had a friendly, informal feel, with Wagoner trading jokes with band members (frequently during songs) and exchanging banter with Dolly Parton and Don Howser. In 1974, Dolly Parton's song "I Will Always Love You", written about her professional break from Wagoner, went to number one on the country music chart.

Wagoner's stage alter ego was Skid Row Joe. The cast included:

 Singer Norma Jean (1960–1965)
 Singer Jeannie Seely (1965–1966)
 Singer Dolly Parton (1967–1974)
 Singer Barbara Lea (1974–1976)
 Singer Linda Carol Moore (1976–1978)
 Singer Mel Tillis (1968 regular)
 Comedian/stand-up bass Curly Harris (1960–mid 1960s)
 Announcer Don Howser

The Wagonmasters

1961 
 Don Warden on steel guitar
 "Little" Jack Little on fiddle
 Benny Williams on banjo and guitar (1961)
 Speck Rhodes Comedian/stand-up bass

Mid 1960s 
 Buck Trent on banjo and guitar
 George McCormick on rhythm guitar
 Mack Magaha on fiddle
 Ray Downs on rhythm guitar and vocal
 Michael Treadwell on bass guitar
 Shannon Randolph Porter on lead guitar

After 1974 
 Bruce Osborn on lead guitar
 Fred Newell on banjo/guitar/mandolin
 Dave Kirby on guitar
 Stu Basore on steel guitar/dobro
 Bobby Dyson on bass
 Jerry Carrigan on drums
 Mack Magaha on fiddle
 Colene Walters on vocals/harmonica
 Mike Pearson on lead guitar

Later work 
Wagoner brought James Brown to the Grand Ole Opry, produced a rhythm & blues album for Joe Simon, and appeared in the Clint Eastwood film Honkytonk Man. During the mid 1980s, Wagoner formed an all-girl group, The Right Combination, named after one of his hit records with Parton, and toured with them for several years. He also hosted Opry Backstage during the 1990s on The Nashville Network. Though Parton's departure was difficult for both, the two reconciled in the late 1980s and appeared together a number of times in the following years. Parton inducted Wagoner into the Country Music Hall of Fame in 2002.

Wagoner made a guest appearance on the HBO comedy series Da Ali G Show in 2004, its second season, interviewed by Borat Sagdiyev.

Wagoner was honored on August 12, 2007, his 80th birthday, at the Grand Ole Opry for his 50 years of membership. It was telecast on GAC's Grand Ole Opry Live that day with artists including Parton, Marty Stuart and Patty Loveless. Grand Ole Opry Live host Nan Kelley was part of the birthday celebration.

On June 5, 2007, Wagoner released his final album, called Wagonmaster. Produced by Stuart for the Anti- label, the album received the best reviews of Wagoner's career and briefly appeared on the country chart.  A music video was also produced of one of the tracks, a cover of Johnny Cash's "Committed to Parkview". He toured during the summer of 2007 to promote the album, including a late-July appearance on Late Show with David Letterman. One of these performances was to open for the rock group The White Stripes at a sold-out concert at Madison Square Garden in New York City.

Personal life
Wagoner was married twice, to Velma Johnson for less than a year in 1943, and Ruth Olive Williams from 1946 to 1986, though they separated 20 years before the divorce. He was survived by his three children, Richard, Denise and Debra.

Wagoner died from lung cancer in Nashville on October 28, 2007, with his family and Dolly Parton at his side. Wagoner's funeral was held November 1, 2007, at the Grand Ole Opry House. He is buried at Woodlawn Memorial Park Cemetery in Nashville.

Legacy
Dolly Parton performed a concert at her theme park Dollywood in Wagoner's memory after his death.

Porter Wagoner Boulevard in his native West Plains, Missouri, is named in his honor.

In 2013, the television show Drunk History presented a brief summary of Wagoner's relationship with Parton.

Dan Cooper at AllMusic noted, "As for his music, after signing with RCA in 1952 he produced a wealth of superb hard country, and just as much of the most wretchedly oversentimentalized tripe you'll ever want to hear. The latter, of course, is half the reason he's loved".

Discography

Studio albums

Satisfied Mind (1957)
A Slice of Life: Songs Happy 'n' Sad (1962)
Porter Wagoner and Skeeter Davis Sing Duets  (1962)
Y'all Come (1963)
The Bluegrass Story (1964)
The Thin Man from West Plains (1965)
The Grand Ole Gospel  (1966)
Confessions of a Broken Man (1966)
Soul of a Convict and More Great Prison Songs (1967)
More Grand Ole Gospel  (1967)
The Cold Hard Facts of Life (1967)
Just Between You and Me  (1968)
The Bottom of the Bottle (1968)
Just the Two of Us  (1968)
In Gospel Country  (1968)
The Carroll County Accident (1969)
Always, Always  (1969)
Me and My Boys (1969)
You Got-ta Have a License (1970)
Porter Wayne and Dolly Rebecca  (1970)
Once More  (1970)
Skid Row Joe Down in the Alley (1970)
Two of a Kind  (1971)
Simple as I Am (1971)
Porter Wagoner Sings His Own (1971)
The Right Combination • Burning the Midnight Oil  (1972)
What Ain't to Be, Just Might Happen (1972)
Ballads of Love (1972)
Together Always  (1972)
Experience (1972)
We Found It  (1973)
Love and Music  (1973)
I'll Keep on Lovin' You (1973)
The Farmer (1973)
Tore Down (1974)
Porter 'n' Dolly  (1974)
Highway Headin' South (1974)
Sing Some Love Songs, Porter Wagoner (1975)
Say Forever You'll Be Mine  (1975)
Porter (1977)
Today (1979)
When I Sing for Him (1979)
Porter & Dolly  (1980)
Porter Wagoner's Greatest (1981)
Natural Wonder (1982)
Viva (1983)
Porter Wagoner (1986)
The Best I've Ever Been (2000)
Unplugged (2002)
22 Grand Ole Gospel 2004 (2003)Something to Brag About  (2004)18 Grand Ole Gospel 2005 (2005)Gospel 2006 (2006)The Versatile Porter Wagoner (2006)Wagonmaster (2007)Best of Grand Ole Gospel 2008 (2007)

 Awards 

References

External links
 Porter Wagoner at the Country Music Hall of Fame
 Porter Wagoner obituary in The New York Times''
 

1927 births
2007 deaths
American country singer-songwriters
American male singer-songwriters
Deaths from cancer in Tennessee
Country Music Hall of Fame inductees
Country musicians from Missouri
Deaths from lung cancer
Grammy Award winners
Grand Ole Opry members
Members of the Country Music Association
People from West Plains, Missouri
RCA Records Nashville artists
Singer-songwriters from Missouri
20th-century American singers
20th-century American male singers
Anti- (record label) artists